Specific properties of a substance are derived from other intrinsic and extrinsic properties (or intensive and extensive properties) of that substance.  For example, the density of steel (a specific and intrinsic property) can be derived from measurements of the mass of a steel bar (an extrinsic property) divided by the volume of the bar (another extrinsic property). Similarly, the specific gravity of a liquid is derived from the density of the liquid divided by the density of water (two intrinsic properties).

Uses of specific properties

Reference tables: Specific properties are often used in reference tables as a means of recording material data in a manner that is independent of size or mass.  This allows the data to be broadly applied while keeping the table compact.

Ranking, Classifying, and Comparing: Specific properties are useful for making comparisons about one attribute while cancelling out the effect of variations in another attribute.  For instance, steel alloys are typically stronger than aluminum alloys but are also much denser.  Greater strength allows less metal to be used, which makes the choice between the two metals less than obvious.  To simplify the comparison, one would compare the specific strength (strength to weight ratio) of the two metals.  A more everyday example is grocery shopping.  The two kilogram package sells for a higher price than the one kilogram package, but what matters is the "specific price", commonly called the unit cost (cost per kilogram).

Mnemonics and Qualitative Reasoning: In many instances, specific properties are more intuitive or are easier to remember than the original properties in SI or English units.  For instance, it is easier to conceptualize an acceleration of 2 g's than an acceleration of 19.6 meters per second squared.  It is hard to remember that the specific gravity of water is 1.0 and that something with a higher specific gravity will sink in water. But if we understand it, it is very easy.

Other examples of specific properties
Examples include: specific heat, specific modulus, specific volume, specific activity, specific impulse, specific power, specific fuel consumption

References

Physical quantities